War Machine is a 1980 studio album by Andrea True. It was her first and only solo LP, after two albums under the Andrea True Connection moniker released in the 1970s. War Machine was a departure from True's previous disco output, exploring new wave and rock music. The album is "dedicated to world peace and finding alternate solutions to energy problems and wars", with its title track carrying an anti-war message. The LP was released only in Italy by Italian label Ricordi International and was not commercially successful. It has never been released in any other format and is now a rare collectible item.

Singles
The title track "War Machine" was released as a single by Ricordi International in Italy in 1980, and was accompanied by a music video. "Make My Music for Me" was released as a single by Atom in Austria the following year. For some unknown reason, the label changed the name of the song, which had appeared on the album as "Makin' Music for Money". Neither of the two singles was successful in music charts.

Track listing

Personnel
 Andrea True – lead vocals, Moog, percussion, production
 Tony D'Ambra – backing vocals, drums
 Tom Bakas – backing vocals, guitar, bass
 Tom Carey – backing vocals, bass
 Jim Callen – backing vocals, bass
 Mark Lineberry – backing vocals, guitar
 Robert W. Brown – backing vocals, guitar
 Ralph Agresta – guitar
 Christopher Carroll – drums
 Chris Bruschi – bass
 Robert Simons – keyboards
 Elliot Apter – Moog

Tracks 1–6 recorded at Homegrown Studios, New Jersey, USA. Engineers: Robert Buontempo and Gary Rickney.

Tracks 7–9 recorded at Media Studios, New York City, USA. Engineers: Godfrey Diamond and Michael Barbiero. Final mixes: Douglas Epstein. Final mix on track 7: Sam Ginsberg of Record Plant.

References

1980 albums
Andrea True albums
New wave albums by American artists